Elijah Clarke (1742 – December 15, 1799) was an American military officer and Georgia legislator.

Career
Elijah Clarke was born near Tarboro in Edgecombe County, Province of North Carolina, the son of John Clarke of Anson County, North Carolina.
served in the Georgia Militia during the American Revolutionary War. When the state troops disbanded after the surrender of Savannah, he became a lieutenant colonel in the Wilkes County Militia. He fought in the southern theater and served under Col. Andrew Pickens in the Battle of Kettle Creek. He was one of three American commanders at the Battle of Musgrove’s Mill, during which he was wounded.

After the war, Clarke was elected to the Georgia legislature, serving from 1781 - 1790. In early 1794, he was asked if he'd be interested in leading a French invasion of Spanish East Florida, but the plot never materialised. Instead of invading Florida, Clarke led men from Wilkes County into Creek lands. In 1794 he organized the Trans-Oconee Republic, several settlements in traditional Creek territory. From there he attacked Creek villages, but was restrained by Georgia Governor George Matthews.

Death and legacy
Clarke died on December 15, 1799.

Clarke and his actions served as one of the sources for the fictional character of Benjamin Martin in The Patriot, a film released in 2000.  He is also a major character in the historical novel The Hornet's Nest by Jimmy Carter.

Clarke County in Georgia is named after Elijah Clarke.

References

External links
Elijah Clarke, New Georgia Encyclopedia.
[Letter] 1783 Nov. 6, Augusta [to] Governor [of Georgia] Lyman Hall / Elijah Clarke
[Letter] 1788 Oct. 23, Washington, [Wilkes County, Georgia to the] Governor [of Georgia] / Elijah Clarke
[Letter] 1788 Nov. 26 [to] Geo[rge] Handley / Elijah Clark[e].
[Letter] 1789 June 24, Hickory Grove [to] Col[onel] Benj[ami]n Cleavland, Franklin County, [Georgia] / Elijah Clarke. 
 Letter, 1792 Dec. 4, Augusta, [Georgia to] Governor Edward Telfair / Elijah Clarke.

1742 births
1799 deaths
People from Wilkes County, Georgia
Burials in Georgia (U.S. state)
Georgia (U.S. state) militiamen in the American Revolution
Heads of state of former countries
Heads of state of states with limited recognition
People of colonial North Carolina
People from Edgecombe County, North Carolina